Four boxes may refer to:
 Four Boxes Gallery, an art gallery in Krabbesholm Højskole, Denmark
 Four Boxes (film), a 2009 horror movie
 Four Boxes (play), a play by Bahram Beyzai
 Four boxes test, used to measure postoperative cognitive dysfunction
 Four boxes of liberty, the concept that liberty rests on four boxes: soap, ballot, jury and cartridge